The 2006 World Figure Skating Championships was a senior international figure skating competition sanctioned by the International Skating Union. It was held at the Pengrowth Saddledome in Calgary, Canada from March 19 to 26, 2006.

Medal table

Competition notes
The competition was open to skaters from ISU member nations who had reached the age of 15 by July 1, 2005. The corresponding competition for younger skaters was the 2006 World Junior Championships.

Based on the results of the 2005 World Championships, each country was allowed between one and three entries per discipline. National associations selected their entries based on their own criteria.

None of the gold medalists from the 2006 Olympics competed at the 2006 World Championships. Stéphane Lambiel, the only defending World champion, won his event.

The compulsory dance was the Ravensburger Waltz.

Due to the large number of participants, the ladies and men's qualifying groups were split into groups A and B. This was the last World Championships to have a qualifying round. Following the 2006 Worlds, the ISU Congress voted to remove it. Following these Worlds, all skaters would compete in the short program, with the top twenty-four then advancing to the free skating.

Results

Men

Panel of judges Men's Qualifying Group A
 Referee: Junko Hiramatsu 
 Technical Controller: Steve Winkler 
 Technical Specialist: Pirjo Uimonen 
 Assistant Technical Specialist: Isabel Duval de Navarre 
 Judge No.1 Katarina Grof Mitrovic 
 Judge No.2 Merja Kosonen 
 Judge No.3 Stanislava Smidova 
 Judge No.4 Karin Ehrhardt 
 Judge No.5 Francis Betsch 
 Judge No.6 Igor Obraztsov 
 Judge No.7 Deborah Islam 
 Judge No.8 Allan Böhm 
 Judge No.9 Deborah Currie 
 Judge No.10 Nobuhiko Yoshioka 

Panel of judges Men's Qualifying Group B
 Referee: Ubavka Novakovic-Kutinou 
 Technical Controller: Benoit Lavoie 
 Technical Specialist: Scott Davis 
 Assistant Technical Specialist: Isabel Duval de Navarre 
 Judge No.1 Paolo Pizzocari 
 Judge No.2 Katarina Henriksson 
 Judge No.3 Jiasheng Yang 
 Judge No.4 Marina Beschea 
 Judge No.5 Heinz-Ulrich Walther 
 Judge No.6 Teri Sedej 
 Judge No.7 Beatrice Pfister 
 Judge No.8 Alfred Korytek 
 Judge No.9 Osman Sirvan 
 Judge No.10 Margaret Worsfold 

Panel of judges Men's Short program
 Referee: Junko Hiramatsu 
 Technical Controller: Benoit Lavoie 
 Technical Specialist: Scott Davis 
 Assistant Technical Specialist: Pirjo Uimonen 
 Judge No.1 Beatrice Pfister 
 Judge No.2 Francis Betsch 
 Judge No.3 Deborah Islam 
 Judge No.4 Nobuhiko Yoshioka 
 Judge No.5 Merja Kosonen 
 Judge No.6 Jiasheng Yang 
 Judge No.7 Heinz-Ulrich Walther 
 Judge No.8 Alfred Kprytek 
 Judge No.9 Allan Böhm 
 Judge No.10 Stanislava Smidova 
 Judge No.11 Teri Sedej 
 Judge No.12 Marina Beschea 

Panel of judges Men's Free skating
 Referee: Junko Hiramatsu 
 Technical Controller:	Benoit Lavoie 
 Technical Specialist:	Scott Davis 
 Assistant Technical Specialist: Pirjo Uimonen 
 Judge No.1 Beatrice Pfister 
 Judge No.2 Francis Betsch 
 Judge No.3 Deborah Islam 
 Judge No.4 Nobuhiko Yoshioka 
 Judge No.5 Merja Kosonen 
 Judge No.6 Jiasheng Yang 
 Judge No.7 Heinz-Ulrich Walther 
 Judge No.8 Alfred Korytek 
 Judge No.9 Allan Böhm 
 Judge No.10 Stanislava Smidova 
 Judge No.11 Teri Sedej 
 Judge No.12 Marina Beschea

Ladies

Pairs

Ice dancing

External links

 

World Figure Skating Championships
World Figure Skating Championships
World Figure Skating Championships
International figure skating competitions hosted by Canada
2006 in Canadian sports 
2006 in Alberta
March 2006 sports events in Canada
Sports competitions in Calgary
2000s in Calgary